Marion Tech or Marion Technical may refer to:

 Marion Technical College, a technical college in Marion, Ohio, United States
 Marion Technical Institute, a vocational school in Ocala, Florida, United States